This article discusses the main players in the oil economy in Angola as well as the political economic history of oil dating back to 1955. Angola is approaching middle income status with a GDP per capita of about $4,100. Angola has the second largest oil reserves in Africa; its oil industry is highly modern and sophisticated. Sonangol, the national oil company, is the dominant player in the oil industry. Some argue that Sonangol funds the one-party state's political machine. Outside of the oil industry, the Angolan economy, particularly the private sector and financial system, is largely undeveloped and uncompetitive. Some political scientists have characterized Angola as a "successful failed state" given the country's high levels of oil wealth and low levels of human development and public service delivery.

Political economic history 
post-1945 (end of WWII): economic growth from agricultural exports, primarily coffee production. During the 1950s and 1960s, Angola was the fourth largest exporter of coffee in the world; Angola was also one of the largest producers of foodstuffs in sub-Saharan Africa.

1955: oil discovered. However, oil did not surpass coffee in terms of export revenue until 1973.

1960 to 1975: public investment in infrastructure and liberalization of investment laws in 1965. Economic development was led by Portuguese settlers in Angola; settlers were the main beneficiaries of economic growth. Before independence, Angola was a mainly market-driven economy. Private consumption was 70% of GDP, while total government consumption was less than 20% of GDP. Private consumption was mostly driven by Portuguese settlers, while most Angolans worked in the contract labor and plantation systems. During the same period of colonial economic expansion, Portugal was also fighting a war to retain Angola as its colony. Portugal's economy was in decline during this period, so many Portuguese emigrated to Angola for better economic opportunities.

1975: Angola gains independence from the Portuguese. 300,000 Portuguese settlers left Angola following independence. Given that Portuguese settlers ran the colonial economy and its bureaucracy, had most of the human capital in the country, and controlled most of the country's physical capital, emigration severely damaged the Angolan economy.

Agostinho Neto, who was Angola's first President from 1975-1979, changed Angola's economic structure from a market-led economy to a Marxist, command economy. Neto instituted a new pricing system, that included price ceilings and subsidized low prices for agricultural goods. The post-independence period was marked by economically unproductive policies that led to price distortions, scarcities of basic consumer goods, and a decline in industrial production. Neto also seized Portuguese-held property and nationalized companies owned by Portuguese settlers.

1975-2002: A combination of ethnic tensions and disagreements between the three main nationalist groups, the MPLA, FLNA, and UNITA, led to a civil war immediately following Angola's independence from Portugal. The war led to a collapse of the rural economy. Three million refugees left the countryside and moved to cities in search of work. The war also destroyed infrastructure in the country. For example, the interior was cut off from coastal urban centers after transportation networks were disrupted and/or destroyed. However, the oil industry remained intact through civil war because oil extraction was the primary means for the MPLA to collect revenue; oil revenue also maintained the MPLA's one-party monopoly over political power.

1979-2017: Eduardo dos Santos and the MPLA consolidated control over the oil economy through Sonangol and instituted a one-party state.

Petroleum and the private sector 
Oil is central to the Angolan economy. Oil and related industry constitute 50% of Angola's GDP and 92% of its exports. Angola has attracted an unprecedented amount of foreign direct investment. Between 2003 and 2008, between $17 and $23 billion dollars were invested in the Angolan oil industry. Multinational oil companies with operations in Angola include ExxonMobil, Royal Dutch Shell, British Petroleum, CNOOC, and Sinopec. Sonangol, Angola's national oil company, is an important domestic institution in the country. Sonangol is highly professionalized and competitive; it is the main engine behind the oil economy. The economy is subject to the vagaries of oil prices. Political stability depends in part on consistent oil revenues to fund government projects and the MPLA's security apparatus. When prices fall, as they did in 2014, the government was hard-pressed for cash and was forced to cut fuel subsidies, which led to protests and instability. Since 2004, Angola has relied on China to secure external financing for projects and to insulate itself from the booms and busts of commodity prices. China has extended $20 billion worth of credit to the Angolan government. In addition to international oil companies, China is a key part of Angola's political economy.

An underdeveloped private sector 
Angola is a one-party state led by the MPLA. According to a World Bank study, the work of building an independent, price-competitive, market-led private sector, and the institutions necessary to sustain and regulate markets, remains secondary to the political, economic, and financial interests of elites. Current impediments to a robust private sector include:

 The financial and banking systems remain underdeveloped. Angola does not have a stock market. This means that oil wealth cannot be maximized long-term. For example, oil windfalls cannot be converted into financial assets that can produce higher yields over time.
 The costs of capital remain high and often prohibit smaller businesses from acquiring loans. Most banks serve large, commercial clients; few are focused on small and medium enterprises.
 Angola has one of the worst business and investment climates in the world. Angola ranks 175 of 190 on the World Bank's "Ease of Doing Business" report. Acquiring permits and licenses for business in Angola is one of the most difficult and lengthy processes. Angola is 182 out of 190 countries in licensing and permitting for domestic business.

Sonangol

A brief history 
In the 1970s, the MPLA put together a commission of businessmen, lawyers, engineers, and other experts to establish Sonangol. Sonangol was an outgrowth of ANGOL, a subsidiary of the Portuguese oil company, SACOR. Sonangol was an exception to Neto's socialist ideology of nationalization and expropriation of foreign property and assets. Sonangol attracted highly competent and experienced consultants, engineers, and other personnel from the international oil industry, including from the US, despite the fact that the US government was hostile to Angola and the leftist MPLA during the Cold War. Sonangol is an example of what political scientist Ricardo Soares de Oliveira calls, "realeconomik," in which the MPLA made a calculated decision to create an "enclave economy" to finance Neto's socialist ideology; revenue from Sonangol also funded war efforts against the South African apartheid regime and the US-backed UNITA insurgency following Angola's independence.

Sonangol's business 
Sonangol collects over 90% of the government's revenues and employs 5,000 people. In 1991, Sonangol expanded its ambitions and restructured as a holding company, with multiple subsidiaries operating in oil services, such as training, air and maritime transportation, telecommunication, and insurance. The process of "Angolanisation," as it is called by the MPLA, has extended into joint ventures with foreign oil companies. Sonangol has also served as an important source of investment in housing, educational scholarships, and sports teams in Angola, many of which cater to the upper echelons of Angolan society. Sonangol is considered to have the most negotiating leverage with foreign partners compared to its counterparts in the Gulf of Guinea. Sonangol has considerable respect within the international oil community, in part because of its marketing campaigns and global presence.

Sonangol's political relevance 
Some, including political scientist Ricardo Soares de Oliveira, have argued that Sonangol is a main vehicle for former President Dos Santos and his Futungo, or close circle of businessmen and family members, to advance their economic and political interests. During the Dos Santos presidency, the president's son, Jose Filomeno Dos Santos, was appointed to manage Angola's sovereign wealth fund. In 2018, current president Joao Lourenco removed him from this post, and Dos Santos is now accused of transferring $500 million out of an account at the Angolan Central Bank. The former president's daughter, Isabel Dos Santos, the richest woman in Africa, was appointed to Sonangol during her father's presidency. She too has been removed and a $38 million transfer Dos Santos made before her removal from Sonangol is currently being investigated by Anti-Corruption Prevention and Control, a government agency under the Lourenco administration. Some have questioned whether Sonangol has been sufficiently transparent in its accounting. For example, the IMF reported, between 2007 and 2010, $32 billion worth of oil revenues disappeared from the company's books. Sonangol has routinely failed to publish annual financial reports. Yet the IMF has also been criticized for its continued loans to the Angolan regime despite the government's failure to comply with IMF conditions, which include financial disclosure, proper auditing procedures, and lawful management, transfer, and deposits of oil rents.

Sonangol's effect on the Angolan economy 
Soares de Oliveira has also argued that Sonangol has crowded out and undermined the Angolan financial system, through its "parallel" sources of financing. Syndicated oil-backed loans, that is loans that are paid in oil (as opposed to currency), and backed by multiple banks, are issued by Sonangol when the MPLA is in need of cash. This "parallel state," specifically its financial engine, allows elites to bypass formal, more aboveboard methods of financing. The capacity and sophistication of Sonangol's financing and debt servicing far exceed the capabilities of other state financial institutions, such as the Angolan Finance Ministry and the central bank.

The centrality of Sonangol and Angola's oil sector has resulted in an otherwise uncompetitive and undeveloped economy. Soares discusses this strategy of monopoly and tight control as inherently political—to maintain and solidify the interests of elites at the expense of the development of the Angolan economy. Sonangol retains leverage and insulation from substantive criticism in the international community that would prompt lasting reform in part because the Angolan oil market is so large. Foreign oil companies are thus hesitant to cause trouble with Sonangol.

The 'successful failed state' 
Political scientist Philippe le Billon describes the oil industry in Angola as an "enclave economy" and an "economic sanctuary" for the MPLA to maintain and consolidate its political power. Despite oil and diamond wealth, Angola ranks 147th out of 189 on the UN's Human Development Index; public services remain poor, social expenditure is minimal, and public health indicators are low. Two thirds of the population live on less than $2 a day. Infant mortality rates are high—one in four children die before the age of five—and rural poverty rates are 58.3% while urban poverty rates are 18.7%. The MPLA is a consistent presence at the national, regional and local levels. Anthropologists have observed high levels of "voicelessness" and "powerlessness" within urban and rural communities in Angola; formalized political representation within institutions of the state remain low, and most Angolans rely on informal institutions such as social networks for support in times of need.

References 

Economy of Angola
Energy in Angola
Political economy